Patricia Shakesby (born 6 November 1942) is an English actress and playwright, best known for her role as Polly Urquhart in Howards' Way. She is also notable for being an original cast member of Coronation Street, in which she played Susan Cunningham, the first on-screen love interest of Ken Barlow.

Early life and roles 
Shakesby was born in Cottingham, East Riding of Yorkshire. She made her television debut aged 18, on 9 December 1960 in Coronation Street. Shakesby played Ken Barlow's (William Roache) middle class girlfriend, Susan Cunningham, for 12 episodes. In the first episode, Ken states he is taking Susan to the Imperial Hotel, which Ken's father, Frank, forbids, as Ken's mother, Ida, works as a cleaner in the kitchens there and Frank does not like the thought of Ken spending money in the same establishment where his mother works hard to earn it.

In 1972, Shakesby appeared alongside Anthony Hopkins in the television series War and Peace, playing Vera Rostova. Between 1985 and 1990, she appeared in six series of the BBC television series Howard's Way, playing Polly Urquhart. Her other television credits include Hancock's Half Hour, Dixon of Dock Green, Z-Cars, The Borderers, On the Buses, The Liver Birds, The Likely Lads, Sapphire & Steel, Casting the Runes and Yes Minister.

On stage, Shakesby has appeared with Ronnie Barker in a 1970s production of The Real Inspector Hound and several plays for the Royal Shakespeare Company in Stratford-upon-Avon and London. She wrote a play, The Lady of the Abbey, based on the life of the wife of Robert Fitzhamon, who founded Tewkesbury Abbey.

Personal life 
Shakesby married Tewkesbury Civic Society chairman Alan Purkiss in 1997. The couple live in Mill Bank, Tewkesbury, Gloucestershire. She won an award for playing the best drunk on television; however, Shakesby is teetotal, as alcohol gives her a migraine.

Filmography
She Knows Y'Know (1962)
He Who Rides a Tiger (1965)

References

External links

1942 births
Living people
English television actresses
People from Cottingham, East Riding of Yorkshire